Travis Tripucka (born May 3, 1989) is a former American football long snapper. He was signed by the St. Louis Rams as an undrafted free agent in 2012. He played college football at Massachusetts. His cousin Shane Tripucka was a punter for the Los Angeles Chargers and is currently an NFL Free Agent. He played for the XFL LA Wildcats in 2020.

Early years
Raised in Boonton Township, New Jersey, Tripucka attended Mountain Lakes High School. He was named to the New Jersey First-team All-Area and Second-team All-State honors after his senior year. He was selected for the most improved freshman award. He also played lacrosse while at high school in which he was a member of the 2004-05 Morris County champion and a Group 1 State finalist team.

College career
He played college football at Massachusetts where he also played lacrosse in his freshman and sophomore years.

Professional career

St. Louis Rams
In May 2012, he signed with the St. Louis Rams as an undrafted free agent. On August 27, 2012, he was released.

New York Jets
On January 3, 2013, Tripucka was signed by the New York Jets to a future/reserve contract. He was released on June 17, 2013.

Personal life
He is the son of Janice and former two-time NBA All-Star Kelly Tripucka who played basketball professionally from 1981 to 1991, as well as the grandson of former NFL (and CFL) quarterback Frank Tripucka. Tripucka has a sister, Reagan, and a brother, Jake who is a midfielder with the Charlotte Hounds. He is also the nephew of standout basketball player Todd Tripucka and Chris Tripucka, former wide receiver of Doug Flutie at Boston College.

References

External links
 Massachusetts bio
 St. Louis Rams bio
 New York Jets bio

1989 births
Living people
Mountain Lakes High School alumni

Players of American football from New Jersey
UMass Minutemen football players
St. Louis Rams players
New York Jets players
American people of Polish descent
People from Boonton Township, New Jersey
American football long snappers
Sportspeople from Morris County, New Jersey